Vincent Faherty (born 13 June 1987) is an Irish former professional footballer.

Career

Early career
Born in Galway, Faherty began his career as a youngster with Salthill Devon. While playing for the Galway representative team, he broke Kevin Doyle's scoring record in the under-18 FAI Youth Interleague competition with 21 goals. As captain of Salthill Devon's under-21 team, he opened the scoring in the 2006 Dr Tony O'Neill Cup semi-final against Sligo Rovers F.C., and led his side to victory in the final, beating Cork City 2–1 to become the first club without a team in the League of Ireland to succeed at that level. In early 2007, Faherty spent two spells on trial with Ipswich Town of the English Championship. He scored twice against Millwall in a friendly, and played for the reserve team against Luton Town, but no contract ensued.

Galway United

After three years with Salthill Devon, Faherty chose to defer going to college and, despite interest from clubs including Ipswich Town and Coventry City, joined Galway United, his hometown team, in July 2007. Described by the Galway Advertiser as having "impressed when introduced for his debut" against Cork City, he appeared regularly for the remainder of the season, sometimes in the starting eleven but more often as a substitute. Faherty's first senior goal for the club coincided with Jeff Kenna's first game as manager, as Galway lost 3–2 at home to Bray Wanderers in April 2008. He finished the 2008 season with five goals in the league, and the following year was the club's top scorer with eight in all competitions, two short of the target he had set for himself. He also notched up 17 assists which was the highest total in the league.

St Patrick's Athletic

Faherty and teammate John Russell were linked with a move to Scottish Premier League club Hibernian in November 2009, and Faherty also had a trial with Crystal Palace of the English Championship. However, Palace's reserve games were postponed because of heavy snow, and when Faherty discovered that players were not being paid because of the club's financial difficulties, he returned to Ireland and signed for St Patrick's Athletic for the 2010 season.

Faherty scored on his St Patrick's Athletic debut against Wexford Youths in a 3–0 victory for the Saints in pre-season. He started the season well, chalking up goals and assists, and was central to a team that found itself top of the table and in the Setanta Sports Cup Final. Faherty finished the 2010 league season as St. Patrick's Athletic's top scorer, with his goals including a diving header against rivals Shamrock Rovers and away to Bohemians.

He left St Patrick's at the end of the season to emigrate to Australia.

Moreland Zebras

Faherty signed for Australian club Moreland Zebras of the Victorian State League Division 1 for the 2011 season. His 14 goals from 20 league games made him the club's second top scorer behind Stuart Nicholson, in the VSL Division 1 list, as Zebras finished as champions, thus earning promotion to the Victorian Premier League. Zebras confirmed that Faherty had signed on again for the 2012 season.

Return to St Patrick's Athletic

Faherty returned to Ireland and joined up again with close friend John Russell when he re-signed for St Patrick's Athletic on the League of Ireland's July transfer deadline day. He was named at number 26 in the squad for the third qualifying round of the 2012-13 Europa League campaign, but did not feature on either matchday. He made his competitive return as a late substitute in a 1–0 win over Cork City on 13 August, and scored his first competitive goal on his home debut in a 3–0 win over Derry City when he "swivelled onto a ball at the edge of the Derry box and unleashed a lethal finish that dipped over Doherty but under his crossbar". This earned him his first start, away to Dublin rivals Bohemians. Faherty again scored in a Dublin derby for Pats with an injury-time header to complete a 2–0 win against Shelbourne at Tolka Park. Faherty scored a 90th-minute equaliser away to Drogheda United in the FAI Cup quarter-final replay to take the game into extra time, and converted his kick in the ensuing penalty shootout to help the Saints reach the semi-finals. He scored his first hat-trick for the club in a 5–0 win over UCD at Richmond Park on 1 October.

Return to Galway United

Faherty was signed by Tommy Dunne for Galway's inaugural season in the League of Ireland. He scored the new club's first ever goal, in a 5–2 friendly win over Sligo Rovers, then scored their first league goal, against Finn Harps at Finn Park on 29 March 2014, and became the first Galway player to score a hat-trick when he claimed the match ball within 19 minutes against Cobh Ramblers on 25 July.

Limerick

Faherty joined Limerick for the 2015 season, and played in a central or wide midfield role for the majority of the first half of the season. Limerick failed to win a game until the 22nd game of the season, when two goals from Faherty contributed to a 3–2 win against Sligo. This was the start of a run of goals for Faherty, who scored 7 more goals in the following 8 games as Limerick put together a run of results in their attempt to avoid relegation from the Premier League. Faherty won the league's Player of the Month in August and finished the season as Limerick's top scorer and the third-highest scorer in the Premier Division. Following Limerick's eventual relegation after a play-off, Faherty returned to Galway United.

Sligo Rovers

On 31 July 2017, Faherty moved to fellow Irish Premier Division club Sligo Rovers. He was signed along with two other players, Greg Moorhouse and Jamie McDonagh. He made his league debut for the club on 5 August, as a second-half substitute in a 1–1 home draw with St Patrick's Athletic; he shot over the bar with the last kick of the match. His first league goal opened the scoring in a 2–1 away win over Finn Harps on 16 September, and he finished the season with three goals from nine league appearances.

Cyprus

Faherty spent the second half of the 2017–18 season with Cypriot Second Division club PAEEK.

Back to Galway United

Faherty rejoined Galway United in January 2019.

International career

Faherty's performances for Salthill earned him selection for the Republic of Ireland at various levels. He played for the Irish amateur team against Northern Ireland in March 2007, scoring twice and creating a third, in a junior international against Scotland in April, and for the National League representative team in the 2007 Four Nations Tournament. In 2010, Faherty played for the Republic of Ireland under-23s in a training match against the senior national squad.

Honours
Salthill Devon
 League of Ireland U21 Division: 2006

Moreland Zebras
Victorian State League: 2011

St Patricks Athletic
 Setanta Cup Runner Up: 2010
 FAI Cup Runner Up: 2012
 League of Ireland Premier Division Runner Up: 2012

Dundalk FC
 League of Ireland Premier Division Runner Up: 2013

Individual
 League of Ireland Player of the Month Winner: August 2015
 League of Ireland Player of the Month Runner Up: April 2016
 Galway United Top Scorer: 2008
 Galway United Top Scorer: 2009
 St Patrick's Athletic Top Scorer: 2010
 Moreland Zebras Top Scorer: 2011
 Limerick FC Top Scorer: 2015
 Galway United Top Scorer: 2016
 Galway United Top Scorer: 2019

References

External links
IrishTimes profile and statistics
St Patrick's Athletic profile

1987 births
Living people
Association footballers from County Galway
Republic of Ireland association footballers
Association football forwards
Galway United F.C. (1937–2011) players
Galway United F.C. players
St Patrick's Athletic F.C. players
Dundalk F.C. players
Limerick F.C. players
Sligo Rovers F.C. players
Salthill Devon F.C. players
Moreland Zebras FC players
PAEEK players
Cypriot Second Division players
League of Ireland players
Irish expatriate association footballers
Irish expatriate sportspeople in Australia
Expatriate soccer players in Australia
Expatriate footballers in Cyprus
Irish expatriate sportspeople in Cyprus